Warming's lantern fish, Ceratoscopelus warmingii, is a lanternfish of the family Myctophidae, found circumglobally in both hemispheres, at depths of between  during the day and between  at night.

Description
The rounded dorsal fin has 13 to 15 soft rays and the anal fin has a similar number of soft rays. The body has patches and scale-like specks of bioluminescent material.

Distribution and habitat
This lantern fish has a circumglobal distribution. In the Atlantic Ocean it ranges between 42°N and 40°S while in the Indian Ocean it ranges between 20°N and 42°S. It is replaced in the northeastern Pacific Ocean by Ceratoscopelus townsendi but is otherwise present in tropical and sub-tropical waters, being particularly common around South Africa and in the southern and eastern China Sea.

The species participates in diel vertical migration.

Ecology
The diet is mostly zooplankton, but in the North Pacific Gyre, Warming's lantern fish was found to feed at night on floating mats of Rhizosolenio (diatoms). This example of herbivory, unusual among deep sea fish, has led to modifications of the gut.

Status
This deep sea migratory fish is of no interest to commercial fisheries and it faces no particular threats. It is common throughout its range, and the International Union for Conservation of Nature has listed it as being of "least concern".

References

External links 

Myctophidae
Fish described in 1892